Slam 100.5 is a radio station in Trinidad and Tobago.

External links 

 Official site

Radio stations in Trinidad and Tobago